Plaza Francia (Spanish: "France Square") is a public square in the barrio of Recoleta in Buenos Aires, Argentina. The nearby Plaza Intendente Alvear is commonly but mistakenly known by the same name. It was created by a Municipal Ordinance on October 19, 1909, as part of the changes introduced in the urban landscape on the occasion of the Argentina Centennial. Designed by French landscape architecture Carlos Thays, it is part of a broad set of squares including Plaza Intendente Alvear, Plaza San Martín de Tours, Plaza Juan XXIII, Plaza Ramón J. Cárcano, Plaza Dante and Plaza Rubén Darío, among others.

The square is dominated by Émile Peynot's Monument of France to Argentina, inaugurated in 1910 and gifted by the French community on the occasion of the Centennial. Its four bas-reliefs in bronze evoke central facts of the history of both countries: the Primera Junta and the Crossing of the Andes for Argentina, and the Storming of the Bastille and Declaration of the Rights of Man and of the Citizen for France. The two female figures that crown the monument symbolize Argentina and France, guided by an angel that personifies Glory. The monument also features plaques that commemorate personalities of French origin: grenadier Domingo Porteau, who died during the Battle of San Lorenzo in the Argentine War of Independence, and writer Émile Zola. A monument to Louis Braille within Plaza Francia was inaugurated in 1977.

Gallery

References

External links

Squares in Buenos Aires